The 1932 armed uprising in Mongolia, also known as the Khuvsgul Uprising was a popular revolt against the "left course" policies of the Mongolian People's Revolutionary Party (MPRP) as directed by Soviet Bolsheviks and Comintern agents in the People's Republic of Mongolia. Principally led by lamas, the uprisings covered the northwest part of the country and lasted from April–November 1932. Most rebels consisted of common herders but even many party members and the local bureaucrats joined the rebellion. The insurgents were spurred on by rumors of support from the Panchen Lama and the Japanese.  More than 1,500 people were killed in the violence as both insurgents and Soviet-backed Mongolian troops sent to quell the rebellion engaged in atrocities. Special study revealed that this uprising corresponds to generally accepted criteria of civil war. Suggestions that the uprising was inspired or supported by Japan or the 9th Panchen Lama are not confirmed by archival documents.

Background

From 1929 to 1932, the MPRP, with Soviet oversight, pushed policies that rapidly transitioned the country from the “democratic” to the “socialist” stage of the revolution.  One third of Mongolian livestock (over 7 million heads) was decimated as herders were forced onto collective farms. Private trade was suppressed and over 800 properties belonging to the nobility and the Buddhist church were confiscated and over 700 head of mostly noble households were executed. Refugees streamed across the border into Inner Mongolia and Xinjiang as scattered local uprisings erupted between February and April 1930 in different areas of southern and south-western Mongolia. In March 1930, Bat-Ochiryn Eldev-Ochir, a rising star of the MPRP's left wing, was appointed head of the Internal Security Directorate and ordered to suppress uprisings by lamas at Tögsbuyant and Ulaangom monasteries in Uvs Province. He and a Soviet trainer commanded the fourth cavalry out of Khovd that swiftly and brutally defeated the lamas. Eldev-Ochir ordered the on-the-spot execution of 30 leaders of the rebellion.

Outline of events

The swift defeat of the Uvs revolt failed to prevent further violent uprisings from spreading across western Mongolia in 1932. The main uprising began on April 10 or 11th 1932 centered at the Khyalganat monastery of Rashaant sum in Khövsgöl aimag, and spread quickly to neighboring monasteries. The insurgents established a high command under the name "Ochirbat's ministry", and began arming the local lamas and laypeople, burning down collective and sum centers, and assassinating opponents, especially local officials and party and youth league members who actively sought to repress institutional Buddhism in favor of socialism.

The rebellion quickly spread to Arkhangai, Övörkhangai, Zavkhan and Dörböt aimags. The Mongolian government responded by establishing an extraordinary commission headed by Jambyn Lkhümbe and deploying Interior Ministry armed units on April 15/16th.  Lkhümbe's troops torched the town of Rashaant, destroyed Khyalganat monastery where the rebellion had originated, and ordered the immediate execution of 54 of the 204 insurgents that were captured. Government forces, with the assistance of Soviet tanks and aircraft, gradually brought the rebellion under control by the end of summer 1932. Through June and July 614 rebels were killed and another 1,500 arrested during the course of 15 battles.  Lkhümbe returned to Ulaanbaatar where, in recognition of his efforts, he was elected First Secretary of the MPRP Central Committee on July 30, 1932. In August, however, the rebellion resumed in southern Khövsgöl and northern Arkhangai aimags. It is supposed that the Mongolian rebels have connection with similar uprising in Tuva.  The uprising was suppressed to November 1932.

The uprising covered an area of about 155,000 km2. The garrison town of Tsetserleg, population 1,195 people, joined the rebellion. In general, most of rebels were common herdsmen. In Övörkhangai aimag 90% members of Mongolian People's Revolutionary Party and the Revolutionary youth union joined the rebels, as well as 95% of collective farms.  Rebel fighting units numbered from dozens to thousands of men. They were armed mainly with flintlocks and antique rifles. Government troops numbered just a few hundred men but were better armed with modern rifles, machine guns, grenades, mountain artillery, armored cars and planes provided by the USSR. Soviet troops were not introduced, but military advisers participated in some battles.

Results

The uprising covered the country's four most populated aimags (Khövsgöl, Arkhangai, Övörkhangai, Zavkhan, Dörböt, partly Altai and Southern Govi). The numbers are quite fragmentary but more than 3,000 people are said to have participated on the side of the insurgents, and they are said to have killed more than 700 people between April and July 1932. According to a short-time chairman of the Defense Council, D. Ölziibat, 500 insurgents were killed in 16 battles, and 615 insurgents were condemned to death by drumhead courts-martial. 35 sum centers and 45 cooperatives were destroyed. According to one Soviet document, 8,000-10,000 people were killed.
Total number of people killed by insurgents is many times less than the total number of victims of the uprising.

Aftermath

Following the violent uprisings, Moscow ordered a curtailment of the unpopular leftist initiatives and pinned the blame for the excesses of what became known as the "Leftist Deviation" on hard-line leftists within the MPRP leadership, including Zolbingiin Shijee, Ölziin Badrakh, and Prime Minister Tsengeltiin Jigjidjav. All were officially expelled from the party in May 1932. The government instituted a "new course" policy in which anti-religious policies were eased after June 1932 and collectivization was suspended. Nevertheless, by this point the Mongolian nobility had effectively been destroyed, and the political moderation would prove to be only a temporary respite: the Buddhist church would be almost completely eradicated in the Stalinist purges of the late 1930s, and livestock would be collectivized again in the 1950s.

See also
War in the Vendée, France
1971 JVP insurrection, in Ceylon (now Sri Lanka, South Asia, Asia)
Stalinist repressions in Mongolia

References

Conflicts in 1932
Mongolian People's Republic
Rebellions in Asia
Armed Uprising (Mongolia), 1932
Khövsgöl Province
Military operations involving the Soviet Union
Mongolia–Soviet Union relations
1932 in Mongolia
Mongolia